The 2022–23 Oregon State Beavers men's basketball team represented Oregon State University in the 2022–23 NCAA Division I men's basketball season. The Beavers are led by ninth-year head coach Wayne Tinkle, and played their home games at Gill Coliseum in Corvallis, Oregon as members of the Pac-12 Conference.

Previous season
The Beavers finished the 2021–22 season 3–28, 1–19 in Pac-12 play to finish in last place. They lost to Oregon in the first round of the Pac-12 tournament.

Off-season

Departures

Incoming transfers

2022 recruiting class

Roster

Schedule and results
Source:

|-
!colspan=12 style=| Exhibition

|-
!colspan=12 style=| Regular season

|-
!colspan=12 style=| Pac-12 tournament

Notes

References

Oregon State Beavers men's basketball seasons
Oregon State
Oregon State Beavers men's basketball
Oregon State Beavers men's basketball